The 2015 Indonesia President's Cup was the first edition of the Indonesia President's Cup. The tournament was held to restore the atmosphere of Indonesian football which was frozen by FIFA. The tournament was held from 30 August to 18 October 2015. The tournament was inaugurated by President Joko Widodo in Gianyar, Bali.

Teams
The tournament was joined by 16 clubs: 13 from the Indonesia Super League and three from the Premier Division.

Notes

Draw
The 16 teams were divided into four groups based on the draw results.

Venues
The group stage matches were played at four locations: Bandung, Malang, Gianyar and Makassar. The quarter-finals and semi-finals were played on a home-and-away system.

Group stage

Group A
(all games played in Si Jalak Harupat Stadium, Bandung Regency, West Java)

Group B
(all games played in Kanjuruhan Stadium, Malang Regency, East Java)

Group C 
(all games played in Kapten I Wayan Dipta Stadium, Gianyar, Bali)

Group D
(all games played in Andi Mattalata Stadium, Makassar, South Sulawesi)

Knockout stage

Bracket

Quarter-finals 

Mitra Kukar won on away goals rule.

Arema Cronus won 5–3 on aggregate.

Sriwijaya won 3–1 on aggregate. The second leg was abandoned and Sriwijaya won on walkover.

Persib won on away goals rule.

Semi-finals

Sriwijaya FC won 3–2 on aggregate.

Persib won 3–2 on aggregate.

Third Place
Game played in Kapten I Wayan Dipta Stadium, Gianyar, Bali

Final

Game played in Gelora Bung Karno Stadium, Jakarta

Statistics

Goalscorers

Awards

 Best Player: Zulham Zamrun (Persib Bandung)
 Top Scorer: Zulham Zamrun (Persib Bandung)
 Fair Play Team: Sriwijaya

Tournament team rankings

Notes

References